The 2013 Trans-Am Series was the 45th running of the Sports Car Club of America's Trans-Am Series.

Rule changes
The GGT class of the previous year was replaced by the TA3 class. The TA3 class was later broken into two groups TA3-International, based on SCCA GT2 rules, and TA3-American Muscle, based on NASA American Iron Racing class rules, with year and model restrictions.

Calendar and results
Source:

Changes

On December 21, 2012, Trans Am announced that the Ford Mustang would be added to the TA2 class, first introduced in 2010.

Driver standings

TA

TA2

TA3

International

American Muscle

References

Trans-Am Series
Trans-Am